The Mitsubishi Raider is a pickup truck from Mitsubishi Motors that debuted in the fall of 2005 as a 2006 model for the United States market and is based largely on the Dodge Dakota. The name is recycled from the Dodge Raider SUV sold from 1987 to 1990, which was a rebadged Mitsubishi Montero. 

The Raider filled the gap in the Mitsubishi lineup since the discontinuation of the Mighty Max in 1996. Though Mitsubishi was still building their own Triton at the time, it would have been subject to the chicken tax, while an American-built pickup was not. Chrysler manufactured the Raider alongside the Dakota at their Warren Truck Assembly plant in Warren, Michigan, but they were sent to Normal, Illinois, for installation of some Mitsubishi-specific parts and for distribution.

Early sales were disappointing, at only one tenth of the Dakota's. As Mitsubishi dealers reportedly had a six-month supply of Raiders on their lots the company was obligated to request that DaimlerChrysler cut production. 9,861 Raiders were built in 2005, and just 297 more were built from the first of the year through March 11, 2006. New for 2006 was the "slammed" DuroCross version, which has lower suspension and an aggressive body kit. The DuroCross had a low payload, of only  and lost most of its off-roading abilities. Approximately 8,200 Raiders were sold in 2007.

A concept truck was rebadged as the Street Raider and designed by Mitsubishi's California design studio. It first appeared at the 2005 SEMA automotive show and since then has been shown at various automotive shows around the United States. It includes 22 inch custom wheels, custom dual exhaust, and a lowered stance among other features not found on a stock Raider. The Street Raider carries a mooted price tag of $60,000, although there are no current plans to sell it.

Annual sales 

(source: Facts & Figures 2008, Facts & Figures 2011, Mitsubishi Motors website)

References

External links
Mitsubishi Raider at MMNA website

Raider
Pickup trucks
All-wheel-drive vehicles
Rear-wheel-drive vehicles
2000s cars